Max Morath (born October 1, 1926) is an American ragtime pianist, composer, actor, and author. He is best known for his piano playing and is referred to as "Mr. Ragtime". He has been a touring performer as well as being variously a composer, recording artist, actor, playwright, and radio and television presenter. Rudi Blesh billed Morath as a "one-man ragtime army".

Early life and education
Morath was born in Colorado Springs, Colorado. He studied piano and harmony as a child and was exposed to the rudiments of ragtime piano by his mother, a schooled pianist who had spent several years playing for silent films. He received a bachelor's degree in English from Colorado College in 1948, before embarking on a career that included jobs in radio and television, jazz, and theater. In the midst of this, Morath earned a master's degree from Columbia University in 1996 in American studies.

Career

Early years
His appearances as pianist and musical director with melodrama companies in Cripple Creek and Durango, Colorado, triggered his interest in early American popular music and theater, including a study of its social and economic history, largely inspired by George and Ira Gershwin, Irving Berlin, and his ragtime heroes Eubie Blake and Scott Joplin. Those theatrical endeavors led to Morath's first professional recordings.

1960s television and theater work
Morath's work in television and theater during the 1960s preceded the 1970s ragtime revival and had an influence on how it was constituted. Commenting on the significance of ragtime, Morath stated, "Scorned by the establishment as ephemeral at best, trashy at worst, ragtime was the fountainhead of every rhythmic and stylistic upheaval that has followed in a century of ever-evolving American popular music", and on Morath, Eric Salzman wrote in Stereo Review: "[t]he person who kept rag alive almost single-handedly during all the dark years was really Max Morath."

From 1959 to 1961 Morath wrote, performed, and co-produced 26 half-hour television programs for PBS, then NET (National Educational Television). The programs were produced by Rocky Mountain PBS in Denver (then known as KRMA Channel 6) and were fed nationally to the public broadcasting network. The Ragtime Era series showcased the development of the music of that period and brought him national recognition. It was followed by the Turn of the Century series, which dealt with popular music's interaction with the nation's social history (and which he afterwards turned into a one-man touring show). The productions were in syndication throughout the 1960s. In addition to his television series, Morath made other contributions to NPR and PBS.  He appeared on The Bell Telephone Hour, Kraft Music Hall, Today, and The Tonight Show. From 1965 to 1972, he was a regular guest of Arthur Godfrey on CBS Radio, and he appeared with Godfrey in television guest appearances.

Touring shows
Moving from Colorado to New York around 1963, Morath was by then performing nationally in college concerts and nightclubs, including New York's Blue Angel and the Village Vanguard with his Original Rag Quartet. His one-man show, Max Morath at the Turn of the Century, was a critical success and played Off-Broadway at the Jan Hus Playhouse in 1969, followed by a four-year national tour. Other similar productions followed: The Ragtime Years, Living the Ragtime Life, The Ragtime Man, Ragtime Revisited, plus Ragtime and Again. These productions also toured nationally following Off-Broadway openings. Morath continued touring until 2007.

Writings
In 1996, Morath earned a master's degree from Columbia University in American Studies.  His thesis was based on the life and work of songwriter Carrie Jacobs-Bond (1862-1946), composer of "I Love You Truly" and other popular songs. Morath's research on her and her times later led to his writing a self-published biographical novel about Jacobs-Bond told in her voice (2008).

With his wife Diane Fay Skomars, Morath co-created an illustrated book on his experiences on the road, titled Max Morath: The Road to Ragtime.

Morath's musical revue One For The Road, a serio-comic exploration of American culture's dealings with drugs and alcohol, was produced in 1982 by the Repertory Theatre of St. Louis and MUNI.

2002 saw the publication of his book The NPR Curious Listener's Guide to Popular Standards, an authoritative overview of the Great American Songbook.

The screenplay of Blind Boone, written by Morath and his colleague Moss Hall, was a first-prize winner in the category 'Music-Inspired Drama' at the Nashville Film Festival in March 2015.

Morath's interest American popular culture extends to the work of humorist Finley Peter Dunne (1867-1936), creator of the popular "Mister Dooley" editorials. An academic article he wrote on Dunne's work titled Translating Mister Dooley: A New Examination of the Journalism of Finley Peter Dunne was published in the Journal of American Culture in 2004. Dunne's editorials also form the text of Morath's musical play "Trust Everybody... but Cut the Cards," presented in staged readings at the York Theater in New York. He is currently working on a 60,000-word volume of "translations" of Dunne's writings out of the Irish dialect in which they were originally published and into standard English.

Recordings
After recording a handful of albums in the then-popular honky-tonk style, Morath recorded albums for Vanguard, Epic, Solo Art and RCA. These included solo piano and vocal albums, performances with his Original Rag Quartet and orchestral works. He also recorded five vocal albums with the team of William Bolcom and Joan Morris. Morath's 1969 album, At The Turn of the Century, encapsulated the essence of his television series and live shows, and helped usher in the 1970s ragtime revival. Albums that followed included Jonah Man, Ragtime Women, and The Great American Piano Bench, each of which went beyond the then-current focus on Scott Joplin. His 1992 album, The Ragtime Man, included his own ragtime composition "Cripple Creek Suite", about the mood of the region's gold rush days. In 2015 all of his ragtime pieces were recorded by Aaron Robinson for the album Max Morath: The Complete Ragtime Works for Piano on the MAI label.  

In the early 1970s, Morath recorded four vinyl LPs for the Vanguard label which presented ragtime in an unprecedented fashion: namely, recording and presenting ragtime in a truly serious manner, and creating four non-commercial albums for a commercial recording company.  These albums notedly highlighted Morath's pianistic abilities.  That is, a warmth and roundness of tone; a spontaneity and lightness of touch; and a complex use of dynamics, changes of mood and tempi.  He has also been recognized as a major influence on younger pianists recording ragtime.

Awards and honors
 In 2008, Morath received the Louis T. Benezet Award from Colorado College.
 In 2016, Morath was inducted into the Colorado Music Hall of Fame.

Partial bibliography
Solo authored

"Ragtime Then and Now". In The Oxford Companion to Jazz, Bill Kirchner, ed. Oxford University Press, 2000, pp. 29–38. 

Coauthored

Discography

Albums
Source:

See also
List of ragtime composers

References

External links

Max Morath papers at the University of Maryland libraries

1926 births
20th-century classical composers
21st-century American composers
21st-century classical composers
American classical composers
American classical pianists
Male classical pianists
American male pianists
American male classical composers
American jazz pianists
20th-century American dramatists and playwrights
American television personalities
Living people
Male actors from Colorado Springs, Colorado
Musicians from Colorado Springs, Colorado
Radio personalities from Colorado
Ragtime composers
Songwriters from Colorado
Writers from Colorado Springs, Colorado
Colorado College alumni
Columbia College (New York) alumni
People from Cripple Creek, Colorado
20th-century American composers
20th-century American pianists
Jazz musicians from Colorado
21st-century classical pianists
20th-century American male musicians
21st-century American male musicians
American male jazz musicians
21st-century American pianists
American male songwriters